The Sisco is a small coastal stream in the department of Haute-Corse, Corsica, France.
It enters the Tyrrhenian Sea from the east of the Cap Corse peninsula.

Course

Its source is to the east of the  Rocher de Pruberzulu and south of Pietracorbara.
The stream flows east-southeast to the sea, where its mouth is in the town of Sisco.
It enters the sea at the Sisco marina, to the north of the pebble beach.
Woods along the Sisco are mainly composed of holm oak, cork oak, chestnut, olive, beech and alder.
The D32 road parallels the stream for most of its course.

The stream is called U Fiume di Siscu in the Corsican language.

Watershed

The Sisco valley lies between the mountains that form the spine of the Cap Corse peninsula and the sea, and is enclosed between two ridges.
The watershed is bowl-shaped, with several streams converging to form the stream above the Moine location.
Flows of water are carried rapidly downstream.
As a result, the Sisco sometimes has severe floods.
The village bridge was destroyed by a flood in 1907 and in 1938.
Further floods occurred in 1993, 1994 and 1999.

Water quality

In August 2021 the mayor of Sisco banned swimming and fishing in the river due to a report that a visitor may have become infected by bilharzia, carried by the parasite Schistosoma haematobium, while swimming.
The disease is very rare in Europe, but had occurred in Corsica in 2014.

Tributaries

The following streams (ruisseaux) are tributaries of the Sisco (ordered by length):
 Porcili 
 Cipriaca 
 Eghiglione 
 Botru 
 Pietratenna 
 Guadillu di Lapidanu 
 Castagni 
 Canavaggia

Notes

Sources

Rivers of Haute-Corse
Rivers of France
Coastal basins of the Tyrrhenian Sea in Corsica